The Abia State gubernatorial election, 2015 was the fifth gubernatorial election of Abia State. Held on April 25, 2015, the People's Democratic Party nominee Okezie Ikpeazu won the election, defeating Alex Otti of the All Progressives Grand Alliance.

Results

References

Abia State gubernatorial elections
Abia gubernatorial
April 2015 events in Nigeria